The Hello Katy Tour was the debut concert tour by American singer Katy Perry, in support of her second studio album One of the Boys (2008). It ran from January 23, 2009 to November 28, 2009. The tour visited North America, Europe, Asia, and Australia.

Background
Perry first announced the tour in November 2008, following the 2008 MTV Europe Music Awards, which she hosted. The concert tour's name is inspired by the Sanrio character named Hello Kitty. In an interview with Billboard, Perry stated, "I have the guy who creates stages for Madonna working on this tour, I'm indulging my obsession with fruit and cats and designing all different outfits."

Concert synopsis

The stage design featured a white picket fence, mailbox, oversized pink flamingos, inflatable plastic fruit, and a giant cat named Kitty Purry that glowed during the encore. Perry had two costumes during the show. During the encore, she would appear dressed as a cat.

Each show would begin with "California Girls" by the Beach Boys being played as Katy Perry entered the stage. Perry would then perform "Fingerprints", "One of the Boys", "Hot n Cold", "Self Inflicted", and a cover of the Outfield's song "Your Love". After the number, Perry would pick up her guitar and perform an acoustic version of "Mannequin" and "Thinking of You". The next songs performed were "Ur So Gay" and "Waking Up in Vegas", where confetti flew over to the audience. Perry continued her act with "Lost", "I'm Still Breathing", "I Think I'm Ready" and "If You Can Afford Me". At this point of the concert, Perry would exit the stage for a costume change and re-appear dressed as a cat. A stage prop of a massive cat head would glow as Perry covered Queen's song "Don't Stop Me Now". Perry would conclude the show with "I Kissed a Girl", and exit the stage after thanking the audience.

Critical reception
The Orange County Register called the tour "a surprisingly strong performance" in a positive review. In a negative review, Variety called the tour "chilly" and "calculated". Seventeen, impressed with the tour, posted a list of ten things they liked about it.

Set list
"Fingerprints"
"One of the Boys"
"Hokey Pokey"
"Hot n Cold"
"Self Inflicted"
"Mannequin"
"Thinking of You"
"Ur So Gay"
"Waking Up in Vegas"
"Lost"
"I'm Still Breathing"
"I Think I'm Ready"
"If You Can Afford Me"

Encore
"I Kissed a Girl"

Notes
"Hackensack", a Fountains of Wayne cover, was performed after "Lost" on August 21 and August 29.
"Don't Stop Me Now" was played before the encore on July 28. "Starstrukk" was played as an encore instead with a special appearance by 3OH!3.

Tour dates

a This concert is a part of the South by Southwest Festival.
b This concert is a part of the Dinah Shore Weekend.
c This concert is a part of the Schaeffer Eye Center Crawfish Boil.
d This concert is a part of the Grammy Celebration Concert Tour.
e This concert is a part of the Pinkpop Festival.
f This concert is a part of the Caribana Festival
g This concert is a part of the Hurricane Festival
h This concert is a part of the Southside Festival
i This concert is a part of the U18 Festival
j This concert is a part of the Nibe Festival
k This concert is a part of the Rock Werchter
l This concert is a part of the Main Square Festival
m This concert is a part of the T in the Park
n This concert is a part of the Oxegen
o Katy opened for No Doubt at this concert. She later joined No Doubt on stage to perform a cover of Adam and the Ants' "Stand & Deliver''.
p These concerts are a part of the  V Festival
q This concert is a part of the Bumbershoot: Seattle's Music & Arts Festival
r This concert is for the benefit of the Typhoon "Ondoy" victims that happened last 23-30 of September, 2009 in  the Philippines. Originally scheduled last 3 of October, 2009 but cancelled after Typhoon Ondoy struck the Philippines on 26 of September, 2009, one week before the original scheduled concert.

Box office score data

References

External links
 Perry's Official Website
 Annullato il concerto di Katy Perry a Milano

2009 concert tours
Katy Perry concert tours